The 1896 Tennessee Volunteers football team represented the University of Tennessee in the 1896 college football season. It was the first official Tennessee Volunteers football team since 1893. The 1896 Vols went undefeated at 4–0 for the first winning season in school history. This was also the Tennessee's first season in the Southern Intercollegiate Athletic Association (SIAA), though they did not play a conference opponent.

Schedule

References

Tennessee
Tennessee Volunteers football seasons
College football undefeated seasons
Tennessee Volunteers football